FC Rukh Brest is a football team from Brest, Belarus, currently playing in the Belarusian Premier League.

History
The club was founded in 2016 as an amateur team. In 2018, they re-established themselves as a farm club of Dinamo Brest and joined the Belarusian Second League. They won the Second League in their debut season, and made their Belarusian First League debut in 2019. Before the start of the season, they ended their partnership with Dinamo Brest and became an independent club.

Honours 
 Belarusian Second League
  Winners (1): 2018

 Belarusian First League
  Third Place (1): 2019

League and Cup history

References

External links

Official website 

 
Football clubs in Belarus
Football clubs in Brest, Belarus
Association football clubs established in 2016
2016 establishments in Belarus